Sufali (also Romanized asŞūf‘alī, Şūfī ‘Alī, and Sowf‘alī; also known as Şūf‘alī Kandī) is a village in Avajiq-e Shomali Rural District, Dashtaki District, Chaldoran County, West Azerbaijan Province, Iran. At the 2006 census, its population was 80, in 17 families.

References 

Populated places in Chaldoran County